Barum may refer to:

Places
Barum, Azerbaijan
Barum, Lüneburg, a municipality in the district of Lüneburg, Lower Saxony, Germany
Barum, Uelzen, a municipality in the district of Uelzen, Lower Saxony, Germany
, a village where the Mesolithic Barum woman was discovered in 1939
Barum, a borough of the city of Salzgitter, Lower Saxony, Germany
 Barnstaple, Devon, UK, also known as Barum

Other
Barum (company), a manufacturer of tires, based in the Czech Republic
 Barum, a pottery mark used on works made by Brannam Pottery

See also
 Bærum, a municipality in Akershus County, Norway